Taiwan Province or Province of Taiwan may refer to:
 Taiwan Province, Republic of China, a nominal administrative division of the Republic of China
 Taiwan Province, People's Republic of China, a nominal administrative division claimed, but never controlled, by the People's Republic of China
 Taiwan under Japanese rule, when Taiwan was an administrative division of the Empire of Japan
 Taiwan under Qing rule, when Taiwan was an administrative division of the Great Qing

See also
 Administrative divisions of Taiwan (under the Republic of China)
 List of administrative divisions of Taiwan
 Political status of Taiwan
 Chinese Taipei
 Taiwan (disambiguation)